Jean-François Coulon (1764, Paris - 1836) was a French ballet dancer and instructor.

After a career at the Opéra de Paris, he founded his school at the start of the 19th century and became one of the most renowned ballet teachers in Europe. Made professor of the "classe de perfectionnement" at the Opéra in 1807, his students included Geneviève Gosselin, Pauline Leroux, Louis Henry, Marie Quériau, Pauline Duvernay, Albert, Filippo Taglioni and above all Filippo's Marie. From 1810 he contributed to the development of the pointes technique.

His son Antoine (1796–1849) made a career at the Opéra de Paris and at Her Majesty's Theatre in London, being the latter's ballet director from 1844 until his death.  He was officially the father of Georges Coulon.

1764 births
1836 deaths
Paris Opera Ballet dancers
Ballet teachers
French male ballet dancers
18th-century French ballet dancers
19th-century French ballet dancers